The 62 Group of Textile Artists is an international group of professional textile artists founded in the United Kingdom in 1962. The group is a Constituted Artists Co-operative, focussed on exhibiting the work of its members in the UK and overseas. Membership of the group is achieved through a selection process. The 62 Group requires members to submit work to a selection panel of their peers for every exhibition "If members fail to submit, or are rejected for three successive exhibitions, then membership is forfeited...a policy which ensures that the group consistently produces exciting work." The increased profile of textile art and its evolution in the latter part of the 20th century "has to a great extent been dictated by members of the 62 Group."

Objectives

The main objectives of the group are:
 To promote Textile Art in major national and international venues
 To provide facilities for its members to exhibit and sell their work
 To create opportunities for the growth and exchange of ideas
 To encourage the exploration of new directions
 To encourage links with international textile groups
 To promote and encourage greater awareness of textile art through education

History

Founding members Alison Erridge (née Liley), Jennifer Gray and Joy Clucas invited a group of embroidery teachers to attend a meeting at The Embroiderers' Guild in London in November 1962. They were concerned about the limited professional opportunities available to embroidery graduates at the time. Contemporary embroidery was hard to find and there was little written about it. The first meeting brought together people from a wide range of backgrounds. Embroidery graduates were frustrated because galleries would not take work "if they thought it was a woman's hobby". The 62 Group "came really up out of several students from colleges determined to get it [embroidery] shown" The meeting also included Audrey Tucker, Pat Scrase, Judy Barry and Marie Shawcross. This meeting created a formal link with the Embroiderers' Guild and at this point, any embroiderer could become a member. Early in the group's existence (1964–65), members realised that the open membership created problems with the quality and consistency of work submitted for exhibitions. It was around this time that selection for membership and exhibitions was instigated and became a fundamental principle of the constitution. This shift also brought about a change to the group's title, as they became 'The Professional Group of the Embroiderers' Guild'.

The first exhibition was remembered by Audrey Walker: "It consisted mostly of small framed panels but the quality of the drawing, design and the subject matter was really remarkable".
Walker reflects 'I thought, this is amazing. Why don't I know about this?' By 1965, she had joined the 62 Group and was exhibiting. 'Jan Beaney was terrific, she insisted I joined. It was wonderful to have the
support of this group. To share a passion.'

The Group was then sponsored by the Art Exhibitions Bureau, an organisation which toured exhibitions throughout the UK. This enabled the group to reach a wider public and to make sales of artwork. The increased pressure to produce artwork became a problem and so touring finished after two years. Following this the group were successful in securing exhibitions at London venues including The Royal Festival Hall (1967), The Victoria & Albert Museum (1970 and 1972), the Commonwealth Institute (1972) and TUC Congress House (1970 and 1972). This period helped to establish a regular programme of exhibitions for the group.

Twenty years after the group was first founded members recognised that the term 'embroidery' was limiting to the scope of the group and the decision was made to open membership to artists of any textile discipline. Formal ties with the Embroiderers' Guild were severed and the group was renamed 'The 62 Group of Textile Artists'. A 1997 review of The 62 Group exhibition 'The Language of Touch' questions if, after broadening the range of textiles disciplines, "one wonders if it is not also too diverse. Does the backbone of embroiderers and stitchers wish to be faced with competition from, for example, classic tapestry weavers? It is not absolutely clear where the group will go from here." An article in Fibrearts mentions the same exhibition and comments that "The extraction of old ideas and injection of new ideas were of benefit. The result was a leaner, stronger body of work than had been seen before. The avant-garde was made up of new members."

Throughout the 62 Group's history, many members have been teachers, lecturers and academics, influencing the future of textile art through their support for textiles in arts education: "we have had a major influence in expanding the acceptance of experimental textiles into the general curriculum in schools, colleges and universities". The group's members have also contributed to publishing about contemporary textiles in journals such as World of Embroidery (now Embroidery) and Crafts and have also published books on the subject.

Exhibitions
Between 1963 and 2011 The 62 Group held 85 exhibitions, mainly in the UK but also in Japan, Israel and Netherlands. The group usually has at least one exhibition per year.

 1962 - 6 Five annual exhibitions held at the Embroiderers' Guild, Wimpole Street, London (from 1964 these toured the UK with the Art Exhibitions Bureau (AEB)
 1967 Exhibition sent to Australia Exhibition, Royal Festival Hall, London (AEB)
 1968 Foyles Art Gallery, Charing Cross Road, London
 1968 Harrogate Art Gallery (AEB)
 1969 Embroiderers' Guild, Wimpole Street, London
 1969 Victoria & Albert Museum, London
 1969 Touring: Wolverhampton; Geffrye Museum, London; Boston; Manchester; Stockport; Wandsworth; Lincoln; Walthamstow; Haverfordwest
 1970 TUC, Congress House, Great Russell Street, London
 1970 Inn on the Park, London
 1971 National Museum of Wales, Cardiff
 1972 Nottingham Library
 1972 Commonwealth Institute Gallery, London
 1972 TUC Congress House, Great Russell Street, London ('10 by 10' to commemorate The 62 Group's 10th anniversary)
 1973 Cartright Hall, Bradford 'Embroidery and Fabric Collage'
 1974 Commonwealth Institute Gallery, London 'Embroiderers at Work'
 1975 National Museum of Wales, Cardiff
 1975 TUC Congress House, Great Russell Street, London 'Stabiles'
 1976 Metropole Arts Centre, Folkestone
 1976 Greenwich Theatre Gallery, Greenwich
 1978 Commonwealth Institute Gallery, London 'Textile Artists'
 1979 Woodlands art Gallery, Greenwich
 1979 National Museum of Wales, Cardiff
 1980 Usher Gallery, Lincoln
 1981 Winchester School of Art Gallery, Winchester
 1981 John Holden Gallery, Manchester
 1982 Embroiderers' Guild, Hampton Court Palace, 'Signs and Symbols'(commemorating the 62 Group's 20th Anniversary)
 1982 Seven Dials Gallery, Covent Garden, London 'Textile Aspects'
 1983 Victoria Art Gallery, Bath 'Textile Aspects 2'
 1983 DLI Museum Gallery, Durham
 1984-1985 Touring Japan; Tokyo, Kyoto, Osaka
 1985 Touring:Clarendon Park Salisbury (organised by Embroiderers' Guild)
 1985 Crafts Council Gallery, Belfast; Wexford, Eire; Swansea, Wales; Cheltenham; South Hill Park 'Handspan'
 1986 Swansea University Gallery 'No More Than a Foot'
 1986 Stitch Design, Docklands, London 'No More Than a Foot'
 1987 Leicester Museum and Art Gallery
 1987 Woodlands Art Gallery
 1988 Gawthorpe Hall, Lancashire
 1988 City Art Gallery, Walsall
 1989 Embroiderers' Guild, Hampton Court (New Members)
 1989 Collins Gallery, University of Strathclydge, Glasgow 'Crossing the Border'
 1990 Bradford Textile Arts Festival, Leeds Polytechnic and Salts Mill, Bradford
 1991 Shipley Art Gallery, Gateshead 'Fascinating Fibres'
 1991 Oxford Gallery, Oxford
 1992 Embroiderers' Guild, Hampton Court (commemorating The 62 Group's 30th anniversary) Touring: University of Ulster, Belfast; Collins Gallery, Strathclyde University, Glasgow; Commonwealth Institute, London; Hankyu Art Gallery, Japan
 1993 Bankfield Museum and Art Gallery, Halifax
 1993 Textil Plus, The Netherlands
 1994 Royal Cornwall Museum, Truro
 1995 Bury Museum and Art Gallery, Lancashire
 1995 Braintree Museum and Art Gallery, Essex
 1996 Quarry Bank Mill, Styal, Cheshire
 1997 Collins Gallery, University of Strathclyde, Glasgow 'The Language of Touch'
 1997 Shire Hall Gallery, Stafford
 1998 Drumcroon Arts Centre, Wigan
 1998 Touring: '50/50: The Challenge of Restraint' The Opera House, Tel Aviv, Israel; Tatton Park, Cheshire; The Knitting & Stitching Shows at Alexandra Palace, London, Dublin, Harrogate.
 1999 Maidstone Museum and Art Gallery, Kent 'On and Off the Wall'
 1999 City Centre Art Gallery, Edinburgh
 2000 Shipley Gallery, Gateshead 'Out of the Garden'
 2001 Cajobah, Birkenhead
 2001 Bankfield Museum, Halifax 'A Collective Response'
 2002 Touring 'Red' (commemorating The 62 Group's 40th anniversary), Bury St.Edmunds Art Gallery, Suffolk; Beverley Art Gallery, Yorkshire; Irish Linen Centre and Lisburn Museum, Co Antrim; Up Front Gallery, Penrith, Cumbria; Midlands Arts Centre, Birmingham.
 2002 Victoria and Albert Museum, London 'In Context'
 2002 Retrospective at The Knitting & Stitching Shows, Alexandra Palace, London, Dublin and Harrogate. 'In Retrospect' (to commemorate The 62 Group's 40th anniversary)
 2003 Harley Gallery, Welbeck, Nottinghamshire 'In Place'
 2004 The Millennium Galleries, Sheffield 'Material Evidence'
 2005 University Museum of Zoology, Cambridge 'Encounters'
 2006 Hove Museum and Art Gallery, Sussex 'Tracing Threads'
 2007 Victoria and Albert Museum, London 'COLLECT' (8 selected members)
 2007 Touring: Textile Gallery, The Knitting & Stitching Shows, Alexandra Palace, London, Dublin and Harrogate.
 2008 Rochester Art Gallery, Kent 'Size Matters'
 2008 Catmose Gallery, Rutland 'Stuff'
 2009 Touring: The Hub, Sleaford, Lincolnshire 'Bending the Line'
 2010 Tour continuing: Museum Rijswijk, Rijswijk, The Netherlands; Collins Gallery, University of Strathclyde, Glasgow 'Bending More Lines'
 2011 Gallery Oldham, Oldham 'At a Tangent'
 2012 Gallery of Costume, Platt Hall, Manchester 'Interventions'
 2012 Holden Gallery, Manchester '62@50' (commemorating The 62 Group's 50th anniversary)
 2012 The Knitting & Stitching Shows, Alexandra Palace, London, Dublin and Harrogate.'50th Anniversary Package Tour'
 2013 Koyo Gallery, Kyoto '62@50'
 2013 Constance Howard Gallery, Goldsmiths University of London,'Small Talk'
 2013 Pink Wood, nr. Bruton, Somerset 'In the Pink' (external installation works)
 2014 Grimsby Minster and Grimsby Fishing Heritage Centre, Grimsby, Lincolnshire 'Ebb & Flow'
 2015 Upfront Gallery, Cumbria '62 Group - Now'
 2016 The Silk Museum, Macclesfield 'Making Space'
 2017 Touring: The Knitting & Stitching Shows, Olympia, London, Edinburgh, Royal Highland Centre. 'Making Space'
 2018 MAC, Birmingham 'Ctrl/Shift'
 2019 Sunny Bank Mills Gallery, Farsley, Leeds 'Construct'
 2019-2020 Touring: National Centre for Craft & Design, Sleaford  and 20-21 Visual Arts, Scunthorpe 'Ctrl/Shift'

Members

Membership of The 62 Group is by selection. Potential new members apply to the group with examples of their work, and a committee of existing members chooses whether to accept the applicants on the basis of the selection criteria. The membership changes each year as new members join and others leave but usually remains fairly consistent at around 50 exhibiting members.  While the group was originally established in the UK, membership is now international with members in the Netherlands, Hungary, South Africa and Japan.

Exhibiting membership 

 Jeanette Appleton
 Imogen Aust
 Louise Baldwin
 Helen Banzhaf
 Caroline Bartlett
 Jan Beaney (Honorary exhibiting member)
 Heather Belcher
 Polly Binns (Honorary exhibiting member)
 Eszter Bornemisza
 Hilary Bower
 Michael Brennand-Wood  (Honorary exhibiting member)
 Lucy Brown
 Hazel Bruce
 Penny Burnfield
 Julia Burrowes
 Nigel Cheney
 Daisy May Collingridge
 Isobel Currie
 Dorothy Ann Daly
 Willemien de Villiers
 Flox Den Hartog Jager
 Catherine Dormor
 Dawn Dupree
 Gavin Fry
 Caren Garfen
 Emily Jo Gibbs
 Ann Goddard
 Rachel Gornall
 Anna Gravelle
 Rozanne Hawksley  (Honorary exhibiting member)
 Maggie Henton
 Michelle House
 Rachael Howard
 James Hunting
 Anne Jackson
 Claire Johnson
 Alice Kettle  (Honorary exhibiting member)
 Paddy Killer
 Joanna Kinnersly-Taylor
 Hannah Lamb
 Jean Littlejohn
 Debbie Lyddon
 Jae Maries
 Sian Martin
 Jane McKeating
 Richard McVetis
 Jan Miller
 Gladys Paulus
 Caron Penney
 Sumi Perera
 Marilyn Rathbone
 Shuna Rendel
 Vanessa Rolf
 Fiona Rutherford
 Tilleke Schwarz
 Lynn Setterington
 Jennifer Smith-Windsor
 Gerri Spilka
 Sally Spinks
 Michelle Stephens
 Sue Stone (chair)
 Hannah Streefkerk
 Elizabeth Tarr
 Audrey Walker MBE (Honorary exhibiting member)
 Teresa Whitfield
 Ealish Wilson
 Atsuko Yamamoto

Sources:

References 

British textile artists
Embroidery in the United Kingdom